Larry Kirwan's Celtic Invasion is a 2013 compilation album of Celtic rock music.  The album's tracks were selected by Larry Kirwan: taig, expatriate Irish writer, radio host and musician, most noted as the lead singer for the New York-based Irish rock band, Black 47.

Track listing

External links 
 ‘Larry Kirwan’s Celtic Invasion’ on Valley Entertainment’s website

2013 compilation albums
Celtic rock albums
Valley Entertainment compilation albums
Celtic compilation albums